Buncombe County is a county located in the U.S. state of North Carolina. It is classified within Western North Carolina. The 2020 census reported the population was 269,452. Its county seat is Asheville. Buncombe County is part of the Asheville, NC Metropolitan Statistical Area.

History
In December, 1792 and April 1793, John Dillard was a Commissioner in a local political dispute of determining where the county seat of Buncombe County should be located. It was provided in an act creating Buncombe County that a committee of five persons be appointed for the selection of the site. A dispute arose between two factions of Buncombe County residents on opposite sides of the Swannanoa River, one faction pressing for the county seat to be north of Swannanoa, which is now the center of Asheville, and the other faction demanding it to be at a place south of Swannanoa River which later became known as the "Steam Saw Mill Place" and which is now the southern part of the City of Asheville.

Buncombe County was organized by European Americans after the Revolutionary War in the home of Col. William Davidson, a cousin of William Lee Davidson and elected as the county's first state senator. The first meeting of the county government took place in April 1792 in Col. Davidson's barn (located on the present-day Biltmore Estate).

At first, deeds were recorded in Morganton, the nearest county seat. This was inconvenient for residents as roads were poor. In December 1792 seven men met to select a courthouse location for the county. The first courthouse was built at the present-day Pack Square site in Asheville.

The county was formed in 1791 from parts of Burke and Rutherford counties. It was named for Edward Buncombe, a colonel in the American Revolutionary War, who was captured at the Battle of Germantown. The large county originally extended to the Tennessee line.

Many of the early settlers were Baptists. In 1807 the pastors of six churches, including the revivalist Sion Blythe, formed the French Broad Association of Baptist churches in the area.

As population increased in this part of the state, parts of the county were taken to organize new counties. In 1808 the western part of Buncombe County became Haywood County. In 1833 parts of Burke and Buncombe counties were combined to form Yancey County. In 1838 the southern part of what was left of Buncombe County became Henderson County. In 1851 parts of Buncombe and Yancey counties were combined to form Madison County. Finally, in 1925 the Broad River township of McDowell County was transferred to Buncombe County.

In 1820, a U.S. Congressman whose district included Buncombe County, unintentionally contributed a word to the English language. In the Sixteenth Congress, after lengthy debate on the Missouri Compromise, members of the House called for an immediate vote on that important question. Felix Walker rose to address his colleagues, insisting that his constituents expected him to make a speech "for Buncombe." It was later remarked that Walker's untimely and irrelevant oration was not just for Buncombe—it "was Buncombe." Buncombe, afterwards spelled bunkum and later shortened to bunk, became a term for empty, nonsensical talk. This, in turn, is the etymology of the verb debunk.

Geography

The French Broad River enters the county at its border with Henderson County to the south and flows north into Madison County. The source of the Swannanoa River, which joins the French Broad River in Asheville, is in northeast Buncombe County near Mount Mitchell, a part of the Black Mountains range. Mt. Mitchell is the highest point in the eastern United States at 6,684 ft. Its summit lies in adjacent Yancey County; the highest point in Buncombe County is Potato Knob, at 6400+ feet, which lies a short distance south of Mount Mitchell.

A milestone was achieved in 2003 when Interstate 26, still called Future I-26 in northern Buncombe County, was extended from Mars Hill (north of Asheville) to Johnson City, Tennessee. This completed a 20-year, half-billion dollar construction project through the Blue Ridge Mountains.

National protected areas 
 Blue Ridge Parkway (part)
 Pisgah National Forest (part)
 Nantahala National Forest (part)

State and local protected areas/sites 
 Beaver Lake Bird Sanctuary
 Big Ivy Historical Park
 Biltmore Estate
 Chimney Rock State Park (part)
 Collier Cove Nature Preserve
 Pisgah View State Park (part)
 Sandy Mush Game Land (part)
 The North Carolina Arboretum
 Thomas Wolfe House
 Vance Birthplace
 Young Forest (part)

Major water bodies 
 Beaver Lake
 Beaverdam Creek
 Broad River
 Burnett Reservoir
 Cane Creek
 Flat Creek
 French Broad River
 Lake Julian
 Lake Kenilworth
 Lake Craig
 Lake Powhatan
 Lake Louise
 Little Pole Creek
 Long Valley Lake
 Newfound Creek
 Pole Creek
 Reems Creek
 Swannanoa River
 Tom Creek
 Turkey Creek

Adjacent counties
 Madison County - north
 Yancey County - northeast
 McDowell County - east
 Rutherford County - southeast
 Henderson County - south
 Transylvania County - southwest
 Haywood County - west

Major highways

  (Small section undesignated)

Major infrastructure 
 Asheville Regional Airport

Demographics

Since 1970, the county has had a steady rise in population, attracting retirees, second-home buyers and others from outside the region.

2020 census

As of the 2020 United States census, there were 269,452 people, 106,741 households, and 63,675 families residing in the county.

2000 census
As of the census of 2000, there were 206,330 people, 85,776 households, and 55,668 families residing in the county. The population density was 314 people per square mile (121/km2). There were 93,973 housing units at an average density of 143 per square mile (55/km2). The racial makeup of the county was 89.06% White, 7.48% Black or African American, 0.39% Native American, 0.66% Asian, 0.04% Pacific Islander, 1.15% from other races, and 1.23% from two or more races. 2.78% of the population were Hispanic or Latino of any race.

There were 85,776 households, out of which 27.50% had children under the age of 18 living with them, 50.50% were married couples living together, 10.80% had a female householder with no husband present, and 35.10% were non-families. Of all households 28.90% were made up of individuals, and 10.60% had someone living alone who was 65 years of age or older. The average household size was 2.33 and the average family size was 2.86.

In the county, the population was spread out, with 21.90% under the age of 18, 8.60% from 18 to 24, 29.30% from 25 to 44, 24.80% from 45 to 64, and 15.40% who were 65 years of age or older. The median age was 39 years. For every 100 females there were 92.30 males. For every 100 females age 18 and over, there were 88.90 males.

The median income for a household in the county was $36,666, and the median income for a family was $45,011. Males had a median income of $30,705 versus $23,870 for females. The per capita income for the county was $20,384. About 7.80% of families and 11.40% of the population were below the poverty line, including 15.30% of those under age 18 and 9.80% of those age 65 or over. From 2010 to 2020 Buncombe County added 31,104 people or 13.0% population growth, making it the fastest growing county in Western North Carolina during the decade.

Law, government, and politics

Local government 
Buncombe County is a member of the Land-of-Sky Regional Council of governments.

Buncombe County has a council/manager form of government. Current commissioners were elected in 2020: Chair Brownie Newman, Al Whitesides, Terri Wells, Jasmine Beach-Ferrara, Amanda Edwards, Parker Sloan and Robert Pressley. The county manager is Avril Pinder.

The North Carolina Department of Juvenile Justice and Delinquency Prevention formerly operated the Swannanoa Valley Youth Development Center in Swannanoa for delinquent boys, including those without sufficient English fluency. It opened in 1961.

In 2019 former Buncombe County Manager Wanda Greene pleaded guilty alongside three former Buncombe County Government employees, and a county government contractor pleaded guilty to embezzling hundreds of thousands of dollars of public funds, accepting bribes, insurance fraud, and federal program fraud. Greene was sentenced to 84 months in prison.

There are two public school systems within Buncombe County, including Buncombe County Schools and Asheville City Schools as well as many private schools and charter schools. There are four colleges in Buncombe County including: Asheville-Buncombe Technical Community College, UNC Asheville, Montreat College, and Warren Wilson College.

Sheriff's Office and policing
The Buncombe County Sheriff provides court protection and jail administration for the entire county and provides patrol and detective services for the unincorporated areas of the county. The Sheriff's Office is organized into five divisions: Enforcement, Detention, Animal Control, Support Operations, School Resources, Civil Process. Asheville also has a municipal police department, David Zack was named the Chief of Police for the Asheville Police Department in 2020. The current Sheriff is Quentin Miller who was elected in 2018.

State politics 
In the North Carolina Senate, Terry Van Duyn (D-49th) and Timothy Moffitt (R-48th) both represent parts of Buncombe County. Van Duyn represents most of the city of Asheville. Edwards represents a small portion of the southern part of Asheville.

In the North Carolina House of Representatives, Susan Fisher (D-114th), John Ager (D-115th), and Brian Turner (D-116th) all represent parts of the county. All three of them represent parts of the city, although the majority of it is in Fisher's district.

Federal politics 
Buncombe had long been a bellwether county in presidential elections. It voted for the winning candidate in every election from 1928 to 2012, except for that of 1960.

Since 2008, the county has trended strongly toward the Democratic Party. It swung from a 0.6 point win for George W. Bush to a 14-point win for Barack Obama in 2008, and has gone Democratic by double-digit margins at every election since then. This includes 2016, when it voted for Hillary Clinton. When Donald Trump won the electoral college (and the election) after losing the popular vote, the county lost its bellwether status. In 2020, Joe Biden's performance in the county was the best by a Democrat since Lyndon Johnson's 1964 landslide.

North Carolina is represented in the United States Senate by Republicans Richard Burr and Thom Tillis, from Winston-Salem and Greensboro, respectively. All of the county is located in North Carolina's 11th congressional district, which is currently held by Republican Chuck Edwards.

Public libraries 
Buncombe County Public Libraries has 11 branch locations, with a central location at Pack Memorial Library in downtown Asheville.

Communities

City
 Asheville (county seat and largest city)

Towns
 Biltmore Forest
 Black Mountain
 Montreat
 Weaverville
 Woodfin

Townships

 Asheville
 Avery Creek
 Black Mountain
 Broad River
 Fairview
 Flat Creek
 French Broad
 Hazel 
 Ivy
 Leicester
 Limestone
 Lower Hominy
 Reems Creek
 Sandy Mush
 Swannanoa
 Woodfin
 Upper Hominy

Census-designated places
 Avery Creek
 Barnardsville
 Bent Creek
 Emma
 Fairview
 Royal Pines
 Swannanoa

Unincorporated communities

 Alexander
 Arden
 Candler
 Coburn
 Enka
 Flat Creek
 Forks of Ivy
 Jupiter
 Leicester
 Ridgecrest
 Skyland
 Stocksville

See also
 List of counties in North Carolina
 National Register of Historic Places listings in Buncombe County, North Carolina
 USS Buncombe County (LST-510)
 North Carolina State Parks
 National Park Service
 List of national forests of the United States
 List of future Interstate Highways

References

External links

 
 
 NCGenWeb Buncombe County – free genealogy resources for the county

 
1791 establishments in North Carolina
Asheville metropolitan area
Counties of Appalachia
Western North Carolina
Populated places established in 1791